Exact is a Dutch software company that offers accounting, ERP, and other software for small and medium enterprises. Exact develops cloud-based and on-premises software for industries such as accountancy, wholesale distribution, professional services and manufacturing, serving more than 500,000 companies.

Exact, founded in 1984, has its headquarters in Delft. It has subsidiaries and offices in Europe, North America and Asia. The company was listed on Euronext until March 2015, when it was bought up by a group of investors led by Apax and in 2019 by investor KKR.

History

Exact was founded in 1984 by Eduard Hagens, Rinus Dekker, Arco van Nieuwland, Paul van Keep, Paul Frijling and Leo Schonk. The six had worked as freelancers for Grote Beer ("Ursa Major"), one of the first Dutch companies to produce standardized accounting software. When Grote Beer fired all of its freelancers, Hagens et al. started their own business. Their Exact Software would later, in 1994, acquire Grote Beer, which at that time had an annual revenue of ƒ100 million,
expanding Exact's customer portfolio to some 60,000 companies.
The former company's name was used as a trade mark until 2000.

Business 
Internationally, Exact grew by acquiring Belgian firms Cobul and Cubic (17,000 customers) in 1989. The opening of offices in the United Kingdom and Russia meant that, as of 1995, 20% of Exact's revenue came from abroad.
Expansion into the German market soon followed with the acquisition of Pcas, Bavaria Soft, Szymaniak (1997) and finally Soft Research (1999), German market leader in payroll software.

In the 2000s, Exact acquired US manufacturing ERP software providers Macola, JobBOSS and MAX. In 2007, Exact purchased Longview Solutions for US$51.5 million. Longview Solutions got sold off to Marlin Equity Partners in July 2014 for an undisclosed amount of money.

The mid-2000s saw Exact embroiled in internal power struggles. In 2004, founder Eduard Hagens returned from ten months of sailing round the world, to find his company reorganized in a decentralized way that did not suit his vision of how Exact should be led. Hagens clashed with CEO Lucas Brentjens and CFO Bert Groenewegen, leading to the resignation in September and October of that year of Brentjens, Groenewegen, and subsequently the company's entire board of directors. Hagens's "coup" (as de Volkskrant put it) caused a staff drain within the company. The following April, after the resignation of the company's new CFO, Hagens announced his own departure. He was succeeded by Rajesh Patel.

In October 2014, Exact announced a buy-out by Apax Partners. That acquisition was completed in April, 2015 for a sum of €730 million. The acquisition meant that Exact was de-listed from the Euronext stock exchange, on which it had been listed since 1999.

Exact was the personal sponsor of Dutch Formula 1 driver Max Verstappen from 2015 until late 2019.

In 2017, Exact acquired the French software vendor Dièse Finance and later the accounting software company Reeleezee in the Netherlands. Later that year, Exact sold their American division including Macola, JobBOSS and MAX to ECi Software Solutions. By then, Phill Robinson was announced as Exact's CEO.

In 2018, Exact acquired three Dutch companies: Parentix, ProQuro and SRXP.

Exact expanded its presence to the construction sector in the spring of 2019 with the takeover of bouw7; a leading Dutch supplier of cloud software for SMEs in the construction sector.

In 2019, Exact also added the Belgian WinBooks to the organization. WinBooks is a software company specialized in accounting and business management solutions. With the acquisition of WinBooks, The Dutch software company increased its presence in Wallonia and Brussels.

In the autumn of 2020, Exact announced both the acquisition of the Belgian HR software supplier Officient and the acquisition of Unit4 Bedrijfssoftware, the business unit of Unit4 that serves the accountancy, SME and large business markets in the Netherlands and Belgium.

Leadership 
In 2019, Robinson announces he suffers from chronic neurological Parkinson's disease. He then continued to work as CEO, but given the further progression of the symptoms associated with the disorder, Robinson took the decision at the end of 2020 to step back and join the supervisory board as non-executive director.

Robinson's successor is Paul Ramakers. Until now, the new CEO, was COO at Exact. Ramakers has been with the company for 25 years and has held various positions over the years.

Products 
Exact's rise to market leadership was mostly based on its MS-DOS-based accounting package, also called Exact. The company also launched a Windows version of this package, but this was heavily criticized because it never attained the full functionality of the DOS version, leading many companies to stay with the DOS software into the late 1990s.

The Exact package was replaced March 30, 2000 with a new product, Globe 2000. This Windows NT-based product was designed around a modular architecture dubbed "One-X" that underpinned all of Exact's offerings. Criticism of this software focused on the fact that the One-X architecture was incompatible with the older Exact software, and that it was tied to Microsoft SQL Server, which was considered too heavy of a database management system for the small computers typically used at Exact's small and medium enterprise customers.

In 2005 Exact Online was launched, the company's effort to bring Exact software to the cloud. With this product, Exact initially targeted only the Benelux countries, until in May 2010 it announced a joint venture with Turkish software developer Triodor to market its product in Turkey as an experiment. The trial ended later that year, with Exact citing a lack of results and announcing a sole focus on its Dutch and Belgium markets. Later, Exact Online tried to expand to cover France, Spain, United Kingdom and Germany. Around 2019, the focus was moved back to the Dutch and Belgium market.

In 2011 a more extensive version of Exact Online was launched; the focus broadened from accountancy software only to include industry solutions such as trade, PSA and manufacturing. In 2018, Exact Online was expanded with the function Exact My[Firm] as a collaboration tool between accountant and entrepreneur.

Other products of Exact are:

 Exact Synergy; for CRM, HRM, DMS and workflow
 Exact Financials; financial software for non-profits and enterprises with a large transaction volume.

See also 
 Baan Corporation

References

External links 

 

Software companies of the Netherlands
Companies based in South Holland
Dutch brands
ERP software companies
Software companies established in 1984